

Ward Results

Monkseaton

North Tyneside Council elections
1996 English local elections